Subject Alternative Name (SAN) is an extension to X.509 that allows various values to be associated with a security certificate using a subjectAltName field. These values are called Subject Alternative Names (SANs). Names include:

 Email addresses
 IP addresses
 URIs
 DNS names: this is usually also provided as the Common Name RDN within the Subject field of the main certificate.
 Directory names: alternative Distinguished Names to that given in the Subject.
 Other names, given as a General Name or Universal Principal Name: a registered object identifier followed by a value.

 (May 2000) specifies Subject Alternative Names as the preferred method of adding DNS names to certificates, deprecating the previous method of putting DNS names in the commonName field. Google Chrome version 58 (March 2017) removed support for checking the commonName field at all, instead only looking at the SANs.

See also
 Wildcard certificate

References

Public-key cryptography